Lavers, Barraud and Westlake were an English firm that produced stained glass windows from 1855 until 1921. They were part of the 19th-century Gothic Revival movement that had a significant influence on English civic, ecclesiastical and domestic architecture, and on the manufacture and use of stained glass as decoration and as glazing.

History

In the mid-19th century, Lavers, Barraud and Westlake were among many young designers who responded to the growing market for stained glass windows. The partnership initially comprised Nathaniel Wood Lavers (1828–1911) and Francis Philip Barraud (1824–1900). Both were originally employed at the workshops of James Powell and Sons. Lavers started his own studio in 1855 and was joined by Barraud in 1858, from which date they operated as Lavers & Barraud.  Nathaniel Westlake (1833–1921), a freelance artist, was engaged by the pair as a designer, having worked with the architect William Burges, and with Alfred Bell (1832–1895), of notable glaziers and designers Clayton and Bell.

The company employed the services of a number of freelance artists apart from Westlake, who joined them as a partner in 1868. These included Henry Stacy Marks (1829–1898), who designed windows with elongated figures in the medieval style for the company in its earliest years, and J.M. Allen, who worked with Lavers and Barraud before the joining of Westlake, also designing windows for the firms of Heaton, Butler and Bayne, and Shrigley and Hunt until the 1880s. Alfred Bell and Henry Holiday also designed glass for Lavers, Barraud and Westlake.

Between 1891 and 1894, Nathaniel Westlake published four volumes entitled "A History of Design in Painted Glass".

List of Works
 St. Peter's Church, Cringleford, Norfolk

Note

See also 
 British and Irish stained glass (1811–1918)

References

Lavers Barraud and Westlake
Defunct glassmaking companies
Glassmaking companies of the United Kingdom